Philip III, Margrave of Baden-Rodemachern (15 August 1567 in Rodemachern – 6 November 1620 at Hochburg Castle in Emmendingen) was Margrave of Baden-Rodemachern from 1588 until his death.

Life 
Philip III was the second son of Christopher II and Princess Cecilia of Sweden.

He inherited Baden-Rodemachern after the death of his brother Edward Fortunatus in 1600, and took up residence at Ettlingen Castle.

In 1605, Philip enlisted soldiers to liberate Baden-Baden, which had been occupied by Baden-Durlach since 1594.  The attempt failed, and Philip's cousin George Frederick took him prisoner.  Philip was held in Durlach, and later at Hochburg Castle, where he died childless in 1620.

Ancestors

References

Footnotes 

Margraves of Baden
1567 births
1620 deaths
16th-century German people
17th-century German people